OU Puppis (OU Pup) is a chemically peculiar class A0 (white main-sequence) star in the constellation Puppis. Its apparent magnitude is about 4.9 and it is approximately 188 light-years away based on parallax.

It is an α2 CVn variable, ranging from 4.93 to 4.86 magnitudes with a period of 0.92 of a day.  Its spectrum has unusually strong lines of silicon, chromium, and strontium, making it an Ap star.

Unlike the majority of star pairs, the number attached to the Bayer designation 'L' is generally a subscript: L1. Its better-known companion L2 Puppis is similarly represented.

References

Puppis
A-type main-sequence stars
Ap stars
Alpha2 Canum Venaticorum variables
Puppis, L1
Puppis, OU
CD-44 3223
034899
2746
056022